Shaikh Muhammad Yusuf (  17 August 1994), known professionally as S. M. Yusuf, was a Pakistani film director and producer. He made fourteen films in British India and later after the split of India subcontinent, he worked in Pakistani cinema and made thirteen films, including a B/W film Aulad (1962) and a blockbuster film titled Saheli (1960).

He was the recipient of Nigar Awards for Best Director
 and later, he became the recipient of an uncertain award conferred by the first prime minister of India Jawahar Lal Nehru.

Biography 
He was born around 1910 in Bombay (in modern-day Mumbai), and then moved to Pakistan in the 1950s. He married Indian actress Nigar Sultana while he lived in India, Their marriage lasted for over five years.

He initially began his career with Shakespeare's plays, and later played supporting actor role in Merchant of Venice, Romeo and in Juliet. The first film he made as a director was Nek Parveen (1946). Before the partition of India in 1947, he was active in Hindi cinema. He made his professional debut in Bollywood industry around 1936 with Bharat Ka Lal film. During the 1950s, he made six films in India. Then he directed film Saheli in 1960 in Pakistan. The film won seven awards, including five Presidential medals and four Nigar Awards.

S. M. Yusuf also introduced two important actors, Waheed Murad and Qavi Khan, to the Pakistani film industry in his films.

Filmography

Death 
He died in Lahore, Pakistan on 17 August 1994 at age 84.

Notes

References

External links 
 

1910s births
1994 deaths
Pakistani film directors
Pakistani film producers
Muhajir people
Nigar Award winners